Crisis Text Line is a global not-for-profit organization providing free mental health texting service through confidential crisis intervention via SMS message. The organization's services are available 24 hours a day, every day, throughout the United States, Canada, UK, and Ireland. It can be reached by texting HOME to 741741 in the U.S. and Canada, 85258 in the UK, or 50808 in Ireland. Crisis Counselors help texters move from a "hot moment to a cool calm" through an approach that is centered on empathetic listening, collaborative problem-solving, and referral suggestions. Crisis Text Line has been growing extensively in popularity since its launch in 2013 and seeks to expand its services to Ireland, Australia, South Africa, and Latin America. As of December 5, 2019, Crisis Text Line has processed over 105 million text messages.

The text line is notable among hotlines for its triage system, in which conversations are assessed by an algorithm for severity and queued accordingly, as opposed to being queued chronologically. Crisis Text Line is also notable for possessing the largest set of mental health data in the world. The organization uses anonymous aggregated texting data to share prevalent mental health trends across the United States and to continuously improve the quality of its crisis intervention services.

History
Crisis Text Line was conceptualized as a result of DoSomething's mobile interactions with its members. Nancy Lublin, DoSomething's former CEO, began creating Crisis Text Line after members of the DoSomething organization started reaching out via text for personal support. Shortly after, the crisis intervention service was given a quiet launch in August 2013 through a text message to DoSomething members in Chicago and El Paso, and was soon being used by texters in every United States area code. By 2015, the text line was being contacted by more than 350 texters-in-crisis every day.

In early 2015, Lublin coordinated meetings over a week "to raise her first round of funding." And "[b]y the end of the week, she had her 'angel' round of philanthropic capital, $5 million, mostly from tech entrepreneurs."

In July 2015, it was announced that Verizon, Sprint, and T-Mobile would be waiving fees for use of the service, and in response to privacy concerns that texts to Crisis Text Line would not appear on billing records. AT&T then followed suit.

In September 2015, Crisis Text Line announced via the DoSomething blog that it would take steps to improve its services for the deaf and hard-of-hearing communities, including training and education for its Crisis Counselors, adding functionality and hiring members of that community.

In January 2016, Chief Data Scientist Bob Filbin was highlighted in The Chronicle of Philanthropy as one of their 40 Under 40 for his work using data to inform Crisis Text Line's efforts. He explains that Crisis Text Line's data collection is centered on  "people in their greatest moment of crisis," and that "most of the other data on mental health and crisis is survey data, which is collected after the fact."

On June 16, 2016, Crisis Text Line announced that it has raised $23.8 million from Reid Hoffman, Melinda Gates, The Ballmer Group, and Omidyar Network, following the funding approach of tech start-ups.

In March 2017, Crisis Text Line began offering its services via Facebook Messenger and in March 2019 it reported passing its 100 million message milestone.

In 2018, Crisis Text Line launched its services in Canada through a partnership with the Kids Help Phone organization. In May 2019, they launched their United Kingdom affiliate, Shout, with the Heads Together Foundation. The text line plans to eventually have at least one affiliate in every country.

In April 2020, Business Insider reported that the novel coronavirus (COVID-19) pandemic has caused "a dramatic spike in people seeking help from crisis text hotlines...The spike coincides with the worsening of the novel coronavirus worldwide, as well as historic layoffs in the U.S." In just a number of weeks, "the number of texts to the hotline has been 47% to 116% higher than an average day".

In 2020, after multiple complaints about management, Crisis Text Line staffers staged a virtual walkout and Twitter campaign (#NotMyCrisisTextLine) demanding the Board of Directors create an "anti-racist" work environment. In response the Board terminated Lublin and replaced two Board members.

Administration
The Board of Directors is responsible for overseeing the organization's activities and goals, and includes danah boyd, Ph.D., the principal researcher at Microsoft Research, and Elizabeth Cutler of SoulCycle. Crisis Text Line also has a Clinical Advisory Board that works to improve Crisis Counselor training and texter outcomes as well as a Data, Ethics, and Research Advisory Board and a Legal and Public Safety Advisory Board.

Crisis Counselors
Crisis Counselors are volunteers. Prospective counselors must be at least eighteen years old to apply and are also required to submit to a background check, complete thirty hours of training, and pass a final evaluation. Graduated Crisis Counselors commit to a minimum of 200 volunteer hours over the course of a year, with a minimum commitment of 4 hours per week. While taking shifts, Crisis Counselors are overseen by paid Supervisor staff members who typically have advanced degrees in counseling, mental health, or crisis intervention.

Strategy 

Crisis Text Line believes that everyone deserves immediate "mental health support at their fingertips." People who are in any type of crisis can reach out to the text line and expect to be connected with a Crisis Counselor in under 5 minutes, although wait times may vary during high-volume moments. Once connected, a Crisis Counselor will introduce themselves and encourage the texter to share their feelings at a comfortable pace. Crisis Counselors actively listen, build rapport, and engage in collaborative problem-solving with the texter in order to identify potential coping strategies. An individualized short-term action plan is created to help the texter cope with the crisis and to remain safe. At the end of every conversation, texters are given the option to provide feedback about their experience with the Crisis Counselor. Conversations usually last anywhere from 15 to 45 minutes. If the texter is in imminent risk of suicide or harm and is unwilling to separate themselves from the means of harm and create a safety plan, emergency services may be contacted in order to ensure the safety of the texter. This is a last resort. These so-called "Active Rescues" are carried out in less than 1% of conversations.

Crisis Counselors also share a variety of resources with texters such as referrals to advocacy networks, hotlines, and mental health support websites. Crisis Text Line upholds specific criteria for referrals and does not endorse products or services that contain fees.

The nature of Crisis Text Line's services is not long-term counseling. The text line should not be viewed as a substitute for mental health treatment or professional mental health care. Crisis Text Line helps texters reach short-term solutions to crises but cannot serve as any type of therapy. The purpose of the Text Line is to bring texters from "a hot moment to a cool calm".

Data collection
Crisistrends.org was launched in August 2014 to collect and analyze anonymized texting data derived from the activities of the Crisis Text Line platform. The data is used to display crisis trends according to texter gender, age, race, and ethnicity. It is shared with the public to help decrease stigma around mental health support. Research agencies and institutions also can have access to this data for research purposes.

Crisis Text Line has many open data partnerships, one of them being a collaboration with the Lawrence Berkeley National Laboratory that aims to predict and prevent veteran suicides. Since Crisis Text Line's launch in 2013, there have been 8 research papers published based on Crisis Text Line's data. More papers are expected to emerge as more data is collected.

In 2014, the organization found that 3 percent of texters were using 34% of organization resources. These texters were continuously using Crisis Text Line's services as a long-term "replacement for therapy," which prompted the development of systems to identify these "circling texters" and to address the imbalance in resource application.

Use of algorithms 
Crisis Text Line uses a triaging algorithm to identify texters who are most vulnerable (including at imminent risk for suicide). Conversations that contain high-risk words and phrases are marked by the triage system and moved to the front of the texting queue, allowing Crisis Counselors to immediately respond to high-risk texters in under five minutes even during high-volume times. Crisis Text Line also uses an algorithm to predict spikes in texting volume. This technology enables spikes to be detected 6-8 times faster, allowing for quicker staffing of Crisis Counselor volunteers on the platform.

Crisis trends

According to the data found on Crisistrends.org, approximately 75% of texters are less than 25 years old and encompass a wide variety of demographics. 19% of texters are from the 10% lowest-income zip codes in the United States, and 14% of texters identify as Hispanic/Latinx.

In December 2015, Crisis Text Line releasing data indicating that bullying and harassment against Muslims was on the rise. They experienced a noteworthy increase in volume immediately after Donald Trump's election as President of the United States. There was also a spike in conversations that dealt with issues such immigration, sexual assault, and LGBTQ+ rights during this time period.

The Wall Street Journal reported on Crisis Text Line's data about prom-related crises, noting that financial concerns were the most prevalent cause of prom-related conversations with the service.

Analysis of the service's data around military texters revealed that active duty service members and veterans make up 2.4% of texters, and that these texters are more likely to be struggling with suicidal ideation or substance abuse.

Crisis Text Line's data also reveals that sadness is more likely to be reported in conversations around the summertime, particularly with LGBTQ+ texters who may be returning home to "unaccepting families". This is indicated by the frequent use of words such as "lesbian", "virginity", and "dumped".

Data sharing controversy

In 2022, Politico investigated Crisis Text Line's practice of sharing text data with a for-profit company, Loris.ai, for the purpose of training automated customer support systems to be more “human, empathetic, and scalable”. The for-profit company and the nonprofit had close ties: Crisis Text Line had an ownership stake in Loris.ai as well as having previously had the same CEO for over a year. The organizations had a revenue sharing agreement, which had not activated as of January 2022. The practice of sharing data from people in crisis drew criticism from privacy advocates and Crisis Text Line volunteers, but the nonprofit company argued the practice was legal because clients had continued texting after being notified of the terms of service in a link.

See also
National Suicide Prevention Lifeline
Samaritans (charity)
The Trevor Project
Trans Lifeline

References

External links
 
 DoSomething.org

Articles
 Prince William reveals he is secret helpline volunteer, June 5, 2020, bbc.com.

Organizations established in 2013
2013 establishments in New York City
Non-profit organizations based in the United States
Crisis hotlines
Suicide prevention
Non-profit organizations based in New York City